Kyrkjedalen Valley is an ice-filled valley between Jøkulkyrkja Mountain and Habermehl Peak in the Mühlig-Hofmann Mountains of Queen Maud Land, Antarctica. It was plotted from surveys and air photos by the Sixth Norwegian Antarctic Expedition (1956–60) and named Kyrkjedalen (the church valley).

References

Valleys of Queen Maud Land
Princess Astrid Coast